Bethel is a town in Fairfield County, Connecticut, United States. As of the 2020 census, the population of the town was 20,358.  The town includes the Bethel Census Designated Place.  Interstate 84 passes through Bethel, and it has a train station on the Danbury Branch of Metro-North's New Haven Line.

History 
Bethel was first settled around 1700. The town incorporated in 1855 from Danbury. Bethel is a name derived from Hebrew meaning "house of God".

The first meeting of the Young Communist League was held in Bethel in May 1922.

In 1934, Rudolph Kunett started the first vodka distillery in the U.S. after purchasing rights to the recipe from the exiled Smirnoff family.

Geography 
Bethel borders Redding to the south, Danbury to the west, Brookfield to the north, and Newtown to the east.

Demographics 

As of the 2010 census Bethel had a population of 18,584. The racial and ethnic composition of the population was 88.8% white, 1.8% black or African American, 0.1% Native American, 4.5% Asian, 2.8% from some other race and 1.9% from two or more races. 7.6% of the population was Hispanic or Latino from any race.

As of the census of 2000, there were 18,067 people, 6,505 households, and 4,846 families residing in the town. The racial makeup of the town in 2005 was 85.86% White, 1.91% African American, 0.26% Native American, 4.58% Asian, 0.04% Pacific Islander, 3.20% from other races or of multiple races. Hispanic or Latino of any race were 4.33% of the population. 20.2% were of Italian, 17.5% Irish, 9.1% German, 7.0% English, 6.7% American and 6.0% Polish ancestry according to Census 2000. 88.7% spoke English, 4.4% Spanish, 3.3% Portuguese, 1.5% German and 1.0% French as their first language.

There were 6,505 households, out of which 38.6% had children under the age of 18 living with them, 62.4% were married couples living together, 9.0% had a female householder with no husband present, and 25.5% were non-families. 20.6% of all households were made up of individuals, and 7.7% had someone living alone who was 65 years of age or older. The average household size was 2.76 and the average family size was 3.23.

In the town, the population was spread out, with 27.3% under the age of 18, 6.0% from 18 to 24, 31.9% from 25 to 44, 24.6% from 45 to 64, and 10.2% who were 65 years of age or older. The median age was 37 years. For every 100 females, there were 95.2 males. For every 100 females age 18 and over, there were 92.1 males.

The median income for a household in the town was $68,891, and the median income for a family was $78,358. Males had a median income of $51,816 versus $36,544 for females. The per capita income for the town was $28,927. About 1.2% of families and 2.5% of the population were below the poverty line, including 1.3% of those under age 18 and 5.5% of those age 65 or over.

Historic pictures

Economy
Battery manufacturer Duracell is headquartered in Bethel.

Arts and culture
Sites listed on the National Register of Historic Places include Greenwood Avenue Historic District, Rev. John Ely House, and Seth Seelye House.

Government

Education
Bethel High School located in Bethel.

Media

Movies filmed in Bethel 
Films partially shot in Bethel include: Rachel, Rachel (1968), Other People's Money (1991), and Revolutionary Road (2008).

Notable people 
 Raghib Allie-Brennan, member of the Connecticut House of Representatives (raised in Bethel)
 Matt Barnes (born 1990), pitcher for the Miami Marlins
 P. T. Barnum (1810–1891), showman
 Barbara Britton (1919–1980), stage, film and television actress
 Dan Cramer, mixed martial arts fighter for the Ultimate Fighting Championship
 Tony Dovolani, ballroom dancer, cast member on Dancing with the Stars
 Kevin Gutzman, constitutional scholar and professor of history
 Allan J. Kellogg, Medal of Honor recipient
 Jan Miner (1917–2004), actress 
 Thurston Moore (born 1958), singer and guitarist for Sonic Youth
 Noël Regney, composer
 Meg Ryan, actress
 Julius Hawley Seelye (1824–1895), missionary, author, congressman, and former president of Amherst College
 Glover Teixeira, Professional MMA fighter
 Annamarie Tendler (born 1985), artist
 Henry Arthur "Art" Young (1866–1943), cartoonist

References

External links 

  

 
Towns in Fairfield County, Connecticut
Populated places established in 1855
Towns in the New York metropolitan area
Towns in Connecticut
1855 establishments in Connecticut